Harold Parkes Learmonth Walker (20 August 1895 – 21 July 1935) was an Australian rules footballer who played with Fitzroy in the Victorian Football League (VFL).

Notes

External links 

1895 births
1935 deaths
Australian rules footballers from Victoria (Australia)
Fitzroy Football Club players
Australian military personnel of World War I